The Big League World Series (BLWS) East Region was one of five United States regions that sent teams to the World Series. The Big League division was discontinued by Little League Baseball after the 2016 BLWS. The region's participation in the BLWS had dated back to 1968.

East Region States

Region Champions

Results by State

See also
East Region in other Little League divisions
Little League – East 1957–2000
Little League – Mid-Atlantic
Little League – New England
Intermediate League
Junior League
Senior League

References

Big League World Series
East
Sports in the Eastern United States